The Mountain View train collision occurred on 8 January 2019 when two passenger trains collided at  station, Pretoria, South Africa. Four people were killed and more than 600 others were injured.

Accident
The accident occurred at about 09:30 on 8 January 2019 when two passenger trains were involved in a collision at  station, Pretoria, South Africa. It is unclear whether the accident was a head-on collision, or a rear-end collision. There were over 800 passengers on the two trains- Four people were killed and more than 620 were injured. Almost all of the injured sustained minor injuries, with some moderately injured. Two critically injured victims were airlifted to hospital. Many people were trapped in the wreckage, and fears were expressed that the casualty toll would grow as recovery operations took place.

Investigation
An investigation was opened into the accident. Vandalism and cable theft were suggested as causes for the accident.

References

2019 in South Africa
History of Pretoria
January 2019 events in South Africa
Railway accidents in 2019
Train collisions in South Africa
2019 disasters in South Africa
Events in Pretoria